The Synod of Livingstonia is a synod of the Church of Central Africa Presbyterian. It was founded by missionaries of the Free Church of Scotland in 1875.

The Livingstonia Synod is located in Northern Malawi, and claims about 25% of the population of that region. It has 170 congregations, about 1,000 prayer houses and 200,000 adult members.

It has 24 presbyteries, namely Bandawe, Champira, Chitipa, Dwangwa, Ekwendeni, Engalaweni, Euthini, Henga, Johannesburg, Jombo, Karonga, Lilongwe, Livingstonia, Loudon, Luwerezi, Milala, Misuku, Mpasazi, Mzalangwe, Mzuzu, Ngerenge, Njuyu, Nkhata Bay, Rumphi and Wenya. The Synod office is located in Mzuzu.

Doctrine
Apostles' Creed
Nicene Creed
Brief Statement of Faith (1924)
Westminster Confession of Faith
Westminster Larger Catechism
Westminster Shorter Catechism

References

External links
 Denominational website

Presbyterianism in Malawi
Presbyterian denominations in Africa
Religious organizations established in 1875
1875 establishments in Africa
1875 establishments in the British Empire